The county of Essex is divided into 14 districts. The districts of Essex are Harlow, Epping Forest, Brentwood, Basildon, Castle Point, Rochford, Maldon, Chelmsford, Uttlesford, Braintree, Colchester, Tendring, Thurrock, and Southend-on-Sea.

As there are 771 Grade II* listed buildings in the county they have been split into separate lists for each district.

 Grade II* listed buildings in Basildon (district)
 Grade II* listed buildings in Braintree (district)
 Grade II* listed buildings in Brentwood (borough)
 Grade II* listed buildings in Castle Point
 Grade II* listed buildings in the City of Chelmsford
 Grade II* listed buildings in Colchester (borough)
 Grade II* listed buildings in Epping Forest (district)
 Grade II* listed buildings in Harlow
 Grade II* listed buildings in Maldon (district)
 Grade II* listed buildings in Rochford (district)
 Grade II* listed buildings in Southend-on-Sea
 Grade II* listed buildings in Tendring
 Grade II* listed buildings in Thurrock
 Grade II* listed buildings in Uttlesford

See also
 Grade I listed buildings in Essex
 :Category:Grade II* listed buildings in Essex

References
National Heritage List for England